KUAZ and KUAZ-FM are public radio stations in Tucson, Arizona, owned by the University of Arizona.  KUAZ transmits on 1550 kHz on the AM dial, and KUAZ-FM is at 89.1 MHz on the FM dial.  The stations simulcast a radio format of news and information, as a member of National Public Radio.  KUAZ-AM-FM carry such popular NPR shows as "All Things Considered," "Morning Edition," "1A" and "Fresh Air with Terry Gross."

By day, 1550 KUAZ is powered at 50,000 watts, the maximum for AM stations.  But because 1550 AM is a clear channel frequency reserved for Mexico and Canada, KUAZ is a daytimer, required to go off the air at night to avoid interference.  The transmitter is off Interstate 10 near the Tucson Premium Outlets Mall in Marana.  KUAZ-FM has an effective radiated power (ERP) of 1,600 watts.  The FM transmitter is on Tumamoc Hill Road in Tucson.

Programming is also heard on KUAS-FM at 88.9 MHz in Sierra Vista, as well as two FM translators that fill in service gaps around Tucson and Southeastern Arizona.

History
It was owned by the Southwest Broadcasting Corporation.

In 1967, John B. Walton, who had bought KFIF in 1965, also bought a station at 580 AM, which he would christen KIKX. The station on 580 could operate 24 hours a day.  Walton then donated 1550 AM to the University of Arizona.  The station became KUAT on October 7, 1968. KUAT initially had a format of classical music and jazz.  When KUAT-FM went on the air in 1975, the FM played all classical music and the AM went all jazz.

The U of A put 89.1 FM on the air in Sierra Vista on April 27, 1992.  It took the call sign KUAZ-FM, so as to distinguish itself from KUAT-FM. The AM station adopted the KUAZ calls on August 11, 2000.

Repeaters
On October 11, 2018, after an 11-year process, KUAS-FM 88.9 came to air for the first time, broadcasting to Sierra Vista, Bisbee, Benson, Huachuca City, and Douglas.  Previously, Sierra Vista received KUAZ via translator K217GI (91.3 MHz).

A second translator, K283DC at 104.5 MHz, fills service gaps in the Catalina and Saddlebrooke areas to the north of Tucson and began operating in 2019.

References

External links
 KUAZ official website

 
 
 
 
 

NPR member stations
UAZ
Radio stations established in 1961
1961 establishments in Arizona
UAZ
University of Arizona
UAZ